Anthony Traill (November 25, 1755 - November 16, 1831) was an Irish Anglican priest in the 18th century.

Traill was educated at Trinity College, Dublin. He was Archdeacon of Connor from 1831 until his death.

References

1831 deaths
1755 births
18th-century Irish Anglican priests
Archdeacons of Connor
Alumni of Trinity College Dublin